was a professional wrestling event promoted by DDT Pro-Wrestling (DDT). It took place on February 17, 2019, in Tokyo, Japan, at the Ryōgoku Kokugikan. It was the twenty-third event under the Judgement name. The event aired domestically on Fighting TV Samurai and globally on DDT's video-on-demand service DDT Universe.

Storylines
Judgement 2019 featured twelve professional wrestling matches that involved different wrestlers from pre-existing scripted feuds and storylines. Wrestlers portrayed villains, heroes, or less distinguishable characters in the scripted events that built tension and culminated in a wrestling match or series of matches.

By winning the D-Oh Grand Prix 2019 tournament on December 30, 2018, Konosuke Takeshita earned a KO-D Openweight Championship match in the main event against Daisuke Sasaki.

Event
On the undercard, the first two matches were presented respectively by Basara and Tokyo Joshi Pro Wrestling, two DDT sub-brands.

Next, on the main card, was the return match of Shunma Katsumata.

Newt was a Rumble rules match for the Ironman Heavymetalweight Championship. During the match, Kazuki Hirata pinned Asuka to win the title before being pinned by Saki Akai who won the match and became the 1,350th champion.

Next was a match dubbed "Taihō Kōki’s Grandson Yukio Naya Ryōgoku Kokugikan First Appearance!" that saw the participation of Go Shiozaki from Pro Wrestling Noah and Daisuke Sekimoto from Big Japan Pro Wrestling. As its name implies, this was the first Ryōgoku Kokugikan match for Yukio Naya, grandson of Taihō Kōki, the 48th yokozuna in the Japanese sport of sumo wrestling.

The seventh match was dubbed "Danshoku Dino Produces Yuru-chara “Pokotan” Debut Match" and saw the first appearance of a yuru-chara named Pokotan (played by Makoto Oishi).

Next was a hardcore match involving Takumi Iroha and Chigusa Nagayo from Marvelous That's Women Pro Wrestling as well as Ryuji Ito from Big Japan Pro Wrestling.

Next was a KO-D Tag Team Championship match that saw the participation of Seiki Yoshioka from Wrestle-1 who teamed with his #StrongHearts stable partner Cima.

Results

Rumble rules match

Footnotes

References

External links
The official DDT Pro-Wrestling website

2019
2019 in professional wrestling
Professional wrestling in Tokyo
Professional wrestling anniversary shows